José González García (born August 12, 1973) is a chess Grandmaster, trainer and writer.

Biography 
After a late start in chess tournaments at the age of 14, Jose struggled to improve his chess for a while until he got the opportunity to move from Mexico to Budapest in 1995 as a 21-year-old chess student. There he worked with some of the most renowned Hungarian trainers and played numerous tournaments on Magyar soil. As a result, he became International Master in the summer of 1995 and later in 1996 the Absolute Mexican Champion.

After four years of living in Hungary, in 1999, he put an end to his first European period returning to Mexico, where he got an offer to join a chess school for talented players in Yucatán Peninsula. There he started his fruitful career as a trainer. Amongst his pupils can be counted some GMs, IM's and several titled players.

The years of inactivity as a player, where he worked only in the interest of his pupils, reached an end as he returned to the competitive chess, winning the Memorial Capablanca in 2003  and achieving the bronze medal, on the third board of the Mexican team at Calvia Chess Olympiad in 2004. He has defended the Mexican team in eight chess Olympiads, seven times as a player and once as a coach.

He moved back to Europe in 2004, becoming a resident of Barcelona where he still lives with his spouse and family. In the summer of 2005 he achieved his last GM norm, becoming the fourth Mexican Grandmaster.

That same year his career as a trainer got a new and important boost as he was selected to direct Barcelona's Chess Training Centre. That was a sweet period for him as some of his pupils achieved very good results in Spanish competitions.

Nowadays he is still collaborating with the Catalan Chess Federation, preparing and accompanying the Catalan youngsters to various Spanish junior competitions.

Besides giving lessons and coaching, Jose enjoys writing about his passion for chess. He is a member of the editing team of the most prestigious Spanish language chess magazine, Peón de Rey  publication where he writes articles on a variety of themes on a regular basis since 2016.

References

External links
 
 
 

1973 births
Living people
Mexican chess players
Chess grandmasters